Oliver Black, is a 2020 Moroccon drama film directed by Tawfik Baba and co-produced by Rabab Aboulhassani and Tawfik Baba. The film stars Modu Mbow in lead roles whereas Mohamed Elachi, Ilham Oujri and Hassan Richiou made supportive roles. The film revolves around Vendredi, a young african boy became a member of ISIS who initially thought to enter the art of circus when crosses the desert to reach Morocco.

The film received critics acclaim and screened worldwide. The film also nominated for the Golden Globes Awards.

Cast
 Modu Mbow as Vendredi (Friday)
 Mohamed Elachi as Soldier
 Ilham Oujri as White Man's Grand Daughter
 Hassan Richiou as White Man

References

External links 
 

2020 films
Moroccan drama films